Domingo Manuel Njina is a member of the Pan-African Parliament from Angola, beginning in 2004.

See also
 List of members of the Pan-African Parliament

References

Members of the Pan-African Parliament from Angola
Living people
Year of birth missing (living people)